Magnetomechanical effects connect magnetic, mechanical and electric phenomena in solid materials.
 Magnetostriction 
 Inverse magnetostrictive effect
 Wiedemann effect 
 Matteucci effect 
 Guillemin effect

Magnetostriction is thermodynamically opposite to inverse magnetostriction effect. The same situation occurs for Wiedemann and Matteuci effects.

For magnetic, mechanical and electric phenomena in fluids see Magnetohydrodynamics and Electrohydrodynamics.

See also 
 Magnetocrystalline anisotropy

Magnetism
Magnetic ordering